Margarida Cordeiro (born 1939) is a Portuguese psychiatrist and film director from Mogadouro. The art concepts developed by her and her husband António Reis are called The School of Reis.

Filmography 
 Jaime (screenplay)
 Ana
 Trás-os-Montes
 Rosa de Areia

References

External links 
 

Portuguese film directors
Portuguese women film directors
Living people
1939 births
People from Mogadouro